The Chongqing Ring Expressway, designated as G5001 and also known as the Outer Ring Expressway, is a ring expressway around the main urban area of Chongqing, China.

Overview
The Chongqing Ring Expressway has a total length of 184.97 kilometers and passes through Yubei, Jiangbei, Banan, Jiangjin, Jiulongpo, Shapingba and Beibei District of Chongqing.

The expressway features six-lane lanes, the roadbed is 34.5 meters wide, and the design speed is 100-120km/h. The Yuzui Yangtze River Bridge and the Outer-ring Jiangjin Yangtze River Bridge cross the Yangtze River twice, and the Shuitu Jialing River Bridge crosses the Jialing River once.

On 26 December 2008, the west section of the Chongqing Ring Expressway, namely the section from Beibei to Xipeng, opened to traffic and on 31 December 2009, the Chongqing Ring Expressway was fully opened to traffic.

References

Chinese national-level expressways
Expressways in Chongqing
Transport in Chongqing